The assertion that the Holocaust was a unique event was important to the historiography of the Holocaust, but has come under increasing challenge in the twenty-first century. Related claims include that the Holocaust is external to history, beyond human understanding, a civilizational rupture, and something that should not be compared to other historical events. Uniqueness approaches to the Holocaust also coincide with the view that antisemitism is not another form of racism and prejudice but is eternal and teleologically culminates in the Holocaust, a frame that is preferred by Zionist narratives.

History
The Jerusalem school of Jewish history originated in the 1920s and sought to tell Jewish history from a national, as opposed to religious or philosophical, perspective. It developed the notion that Jewish history itself was unique, a progenitor to the idea of the uniqueness of the Holocaust. The uniqueness of the Holocaust was advanced while it was ongoing by the World Jewish Congress (WJC), but rejected by governments of countries in German-occupied Europe. In the early decades of Holocaust studies, scholars approached the Holocaust as a genocide unique in its reach and specificity. Holocaust uniqueness became a subject for scholars in the 1970s and 1980s, in response to efforts to historicize the Holocaust via such concepts as totalitarianism, fascism, functionalism, modernity, and genocide.  

In West Germany, the Historikerstreit ("historians' dispute") erupted in the late 1980s over attempts to challenge the position of the Holocaust in West German historiography and compare Nazi Germany with the Soviet Union. Critics saw this challenge as an attempt to relativize the Holocaust. In the 1980s and 1990s, a set of scholars, including Emil Fackenheim, Lucy Dawidowicz, Saul Friedländer, Yehuda Bauer, Steven Katz, Deborah Lipstadt, and Daniel Goldhagen—mostly from the field of Jewish studies—authored various studies to prove the Holocaust's uniqueness. They were challenged by another set of scholars from a wide diversity of viewpoints that rejected the uniqueness of the Holocaust and compared it to other events, which was then met with an angry backlash from uniqueness supporters. Around the turn of the twenty-first century, polemical approaches for the debate were exchanged for analytical ones relating to claims of uniqueness in Holocaust memory.

In the twenty-first century, several scholars including Alon Confino and Doris Bergen have described uniqueness claims regarding the Holocaust as outdated or no longer relevant to academic debate. In 2021, A. Dirk Moses initiated the catechism debate, challenging the uniqueness of the Holocaust in German Holocaust memory. The same year, in his book The Problems of Genocide, Moses argued that the development of the concept of genocide based on the Holocaust led to disregard of other forms of mass civilian death that could not be analogized to the Holocaust.

Arguments
Proponents of uniqueness argue that the Holocaust had unique aspects not found in other historical events. In particular, supporters of uniqueness argue that the Holocaust was the "only genocide in which the murderers’ goal was the total extermination of the victim, with no rational or pragmatic reason". However, the accuracy of this statement has been disputed. The counterargument is that every historical event has unique features. Therefore, historian Dan Stone argues that uniqueness proponents are in fact making ideological rather than historical claims.

Critics of the uniqueness concept have argued that it is Eurocentric. Some Holocaust scholars who support the uniqueness concept deny other genocides, such as the Romani Holocaust and the Armenian genocide.

See also
Armenian genocide and the Holocaust
Holocaust trivialization

References

Sources

Uniqueness debate
Exceptionalism